Five Dolls for an August Moon (Italian: 5 bambole per la luna d'agosto) is a 1970 Italian giallo film directed by Mario Bava. It concerns a group of people who have gathered on a remote island for fun and relaxation. One of the guests is a chemist who has created a revolutionary new chemical process, and several of the attending industrialists are eager to buy it from him. Business problems become moot when someone begins killing off the attendees one by one.

Plot 
At the private island retreat of wealthy industrialist George Stark, a group of people have assembled for a weekend getaway; among the guests is scientist Professor Gerry Farrell. The first night passes uneventfully, but Farrell is enraged the next morning to discover that Stark and the other guests planned the weekend to coerce him to sell his latest invention: a formula for a revolutionary industrial resin, which he is reluctant to divulge due to his colleague's death during its invention.

Farrell's wife, Trudy, is having an affair with Stark's artist wife, Jill. Stark's business partner, Nick, is verbally abusive to his coquettish wife Marie, but does not object to her sleeping with other men, one of whom is the Starks' manservant, Charles. Stark is less of a husband to Jill than he is a business manager. He arranges for her to have her paintings and artwork publicly displayed and is a source of constant criticism. The sole happy couple is Nick's co-worker Jack and his wife Peggy. Also on the island is Isabelle, the teenage daughter of Stark's game warden; Isabelle's parents are away for medical reasons.

As Stark, Nick, and Jack badger Farrell for the formula - the original documents for which he has secretly destroyed - by offering him cheques for $1 million each from their Swiss bank accounts, Jill discovers the dead body of Charles on the beach. Having already sent the motor launch away to prevent Farrell from leaving the island, and with the radio out of commission, Stark has no way of contacting the mainland. Charles' body is moved into a large walk-in freezer. The next morning, Farrell is walking alone on the beach. Trudy and Jill, walking hand-in-hand nearby, hear a gunshot and find Farrell's body. They run away to tell the others. The sniper, Isabelle, drags Farrell's body to the sea.

As tempers flare to Farrell's apparent death and disappearance, the killings escalate. Peggy, standing on the balcony of her room, is shot dead by an unseen assailant. Jack arrives on the scene first and accuses Stark of being responsible. Marie is found to have been tied to a tree and stabbed in the chest. Jill turns up dead in her bathtub, her wrists slashed in an apparent suicide. Each of the bodies is placed in the freezer. The four remaining survivors - Stark, Jack, Nick, and Trudy - hold up in Stark's living room for the night. After bickering with Trudy, Nick storms off. The next morning, he too is found dead, and his body is placed in cold storage.

Stark offers Trudy his cheque for Farrell's formula, which she reveals still exists on a microfilm, and uncovers a previously-hidden motorboat which will take them to the mainland. As he returns to the house to get supplies, Jack confronts him and reveals he killed everyone, except for Farrell, to steal their cheques; he also killed Peggy for nearly discovering his plan. Jack shoots him dead. Confronted by him in the freezer, Trudy offers to give him the formula in exchange for his cheque; during the handover, they simultaneously shoot each other; Trudy dies first. Isabelle steals the cheque and the formula, but not before an expiring Jack tries to stop her.

Sometime later, a now-wealthy Isabelle visits Farrell in prison, where he is awaiting execution for the murder of his colleague, the rightful discoverer of the resin. Isabelle claims that she loves Farrell and had decided to save him by rendering him unconscious with a sodium pentathol pellet of the kind her father had used to tranquilize animals, but was unaware of sodium pentathol's truth serum properties, leading him to confess to killing his partner to the authorities. Isabelle reveals that she is broke, having cashed and spent George's and Jack's cheques but not Nick's due to her not knowing the account number. Aware of his inescapable fate and thankful to her, Farrell gives Isabelle the number, and she happily leaves, instructing her chauffeur to drive her to Lausanne.

Cast 
William Berger as Professor Gerry Farrell (Professore Fritz Farrell in the Italian version)
Princess Ira von Fürstenberg as Trudy Farrell
Edwige Fenech as Marie Chaney
Howard Ross as Jack Davidson
Helena Ronee as Peggy Davidson
Teodoro Corrà as George Stark
Justine Gall as Isabel
Edith Meloni as Jill Stark
Mauro Bosco as Charles (Jacques)
Maurice Poli as Nick Chaney

Production
Produzioni Atlas Consorziate purchased Mario di Nardo's script for Five Dolls for an August Moon with plans to make it into a vehicle for actress Edwige Fenech, though early publicity instead spotlighted Princess Ira von Fürstenberg (who was one of the film's principal investors). The film lost its director just days before filming was scheduled to begin, leading producers Mario and Pietro Bregni to appeal to Mario Bava to take over. Though there is no record of who the original director was, Mario Bava biographer Tim Lucas reasons that it was mostly likely Guido Malatesta. Bava was very reluctant to take on the project, since he felt the script was a poorly written ripoff of Agatha Christie's novel And Then There Were None, but agreed to do it under the condition that he be paid up front. He was further dismayed when, at the meeting where he was presented with the contract for the movie, the Bregnis told him that the original director's departure was so last-minute that the cast and technical crew had already been selected and filming was to begin in just two days, leaving him no time to rework the script.

However, in addition to insisting on the use of his usual camera crew (headed by Antonio Rinaldi), Bava made two significant changes to the film's script: putting the corpses in polythene bags inside a walk-in freezer (di Nardo's script put them in underground graves with cross-shaped headstones) and adding on the twist ending with Farrell and Isabelle.

The film's budget was so low that most of the cast had to wear their own clothes. The exterior of the Stark house was a matte painting painted by Bava himself, while the interior was a real beach house located not far from the beach where many of the scenes were filmed, on the Torre Astura coastline. Five Dolls for an August Moon was the only film where Bava had to do the editing entirely by himself.

Release 
Debuting on Valentine's Day 1970, Five Dolls for an August Moon was a failure at the Italian box office.

Five Dolls for an August Moon was one of Bava's most obscure films, and did not receive an official American release until 2001 when Image Entertainment distributed it on DVD. After the Image disc went out of print, Anchor Bay re-released as part of the "Mario Bava Collection Volume 2" box set on 23 October 2007. The film was released in France as L'île de l'épouvante / Island of Terror. In 2013, Kino International released the film on Blu-ray in the United States.

Critical reception 
AllMovie gave it two stars out of five, calling it "a confusing and not terribly exciting whodunit." The reviewer placed the blame for the film's failure primarily on the script, and commended director for managing to inject some visual interest into the weak material.

In his review of the 2013 American Blu-ray release for Slant Magazine, Budd Wilkins writes "Five Dolls for an August Moon isn't top-tier Bava by any means, but for those with eyes to see, there are pleasures aplenty to be gleaned from this playfully abstract jeu d'esprit.". Arrow Films released the film on blu ray in 2016.

In his commentary track for the Kino International Blu-ray release of the film, Mario Bava scholar Tim Lucas argues strongly against Cazzinos own assessment of the film as one of his worst and calls it one of his most beautiful and innovative films.

Notes

References

External links 
 

1970 films
Giallo films
Films directed by Mario Bava
Films scored by Piero Umiliani
Italian thriller films
1970s Italian films